Celia Andrea Bonilla Gemio (born 4 August 1978) is a Bolivian agricultural worker, politician, and trade unionist who served as a party-list member of the Chamber of Deputies from La Paz from 2015 to 2020. An ethnic Afro-Bolivian, Bonilla's career got its start in northern La Paz's agrarian trade unions, where she held positions as an executive and women's representative. Her prominence there aided in her nomination on the Movement for Socialism's 2014 party list, through which she was elected to the Chamber of Deputies. As a legislator, Bonilla holds the distinction of being the first Afro-Bolivian woman in Bolivian parliamentary history to serve in the lower chamber. She is, together with Ancelma Perlacios, one of the first two Afro-Bolivian women in parliament, and is one of just three overall, after Jorge Medina.

Early life and career 
Andrea Bonilla was born on 4 August 1978 in Caranavi, capital of the namesake province in the tropical Yungas region of La Paz. Bonilla spent much of her early life involved in agricultural work before becoming active in the region's agrarian trade syndicates. She served as executive secretary of a workers' federation in neighboring Teoponte Municipality, later joining the Departmental Federation of Intercultural Communities of La Paz, the leading union representing the department's agricultural settlers. Bonilla held office as the organization's women's representative until around 2014, the year she was elected to the Chamber of Deputies.

Chamber of Deputies

Election 

Prominent leaders and representatives of agrarian and rural syndicates had long been a mainstay on the governing Movement for Socialism (MAS)'s electoral lists. In 2014, in particular, women trade unionists of rural backgrounds were given an increased presence, an action that produced the largest caucus of peasant women elected to parliament in Bolivian history. Included among this group was Bonilla, one of three Afro-Bolivian candidates on the ballot that election cycle, alongside Ancelma Perlacios and Mónica Rey.

Tenure 
Entering parliament, Bonilla became the first female member of the Afro-Bolivian community to serve in the Chamber of Deputies and was the second overall, after Jorge Medina, who represented La Paz in the previous legislature. She was one of the first two black women to hold a seat in parliament, a distinction she shares with Ancelma Perlacios, who was sworn into the Senate on the same day. They are, together, the most recent Afro-Bolivians represented in the legislature. At the conclusion of their terms, neither were nominated for reelection, be it in the annulled 2019 election or the rerun 2020 contest.

Commission assignments 
 Constitution, Legislation, and Electoral System Commission
 Democracy and Electoral System Committee (–)
 Rural Native Indigenous Peoples and Nations, Cultures, and Interculturality Commission
 Coca Leaf Committee (–)
 Human Rights Commission (President: –)
 Human Rights and Equal Opportunities Committee (Secretary: –)
 Government, Defense, and Armed Forces Commission
 Defense, Armed Forces, Borders, and Civil Defense Committee (–)

Electoral history

References

Notes

Footnotes

Bibliography

External links 
 Deputies profile Vice Presidency .
 Deputies profile Chamber of Deputies . Archived from the original on 7 July 2020.

1978 births
Living people
21st-century Bolivian politicians
21st-century Bolivian women politicians
Afro-Bolivian people
Bolivian trade union leaders
Bolivian women trade unionists
Members of the Bolivian Chamber of Deputies from La Paz
Movement for Socialism (Bolivia) politicians
People from Caranavi Province
Women members of the Chamber of Deputies (Bolivia)